The TI-83 Premium CE (also written as 83PCE or 83CE) is a color graphing calculator, released on January 15, 2015 by TI France. It is the French equivalent of the TI-84 Plus CE, with translated key labels, a French-specific exam mode, and an "exact math" engine.

General 
In addition to the traditional functions of the 83/84 series (e.g., MathPrint), TI announced features similar to those of the 84+CSE and the 84+CE. However, this model adds an exact calculation engine and a new equation solving tool.

Programming 
Like the other calculators in the 83/84 series, the official programming language supported is TI-Basic z80.

However, in early 2019, programming in Python became possible through an external "TI-Python" module. In the end of June 2019, TI launched the TI-83 Premium CE Edition Python model which, in addition to improving performance via faster Flash memory, integrates the ARM microprocessor of the external TI-Python module directly inside the calculator.

Specifications

Components 

 High resolution 320 × 240 pixel color screen, 140 DPI, backlit.
 3.0 MB of usable flash ROM (4.0 MB chip, WinBond W29GL032CB7S or W25Q32JVS1Q on Python Edition)
 (ASIC) 150 KB of usable RAM (256 KB chip)
 (ASIC) Zilog eZ80 CPU (Zilog Z80 compatible evolution, faster and able to handle more RAM)
 USB rechargeable battery

Emulation 
TI offers its TI-SmartView CE emulator dedicated to this machine. There is a total redesign compared to older SmartView software.

There is also a community free, open-source, native and portable emulator for TI-84 Plus CE and TI-83 Premium CE, called CEmu.

See also 
 Related models:
 TI-84 Plus CE
 TI-84 Plus C Silver Edition

References 

Texas Instruments programmable calculators
Products introduced in 2015
Graphing calculators